The 2014 Aaron's 499 was a NASCAR Sprint Cup Series stock car race run on May 4, 2014, at Talladega Superspeedway in Lincoln, Alabama. Contested over 188 laps on the  tri-oval, it was the tenth race of the 2014 NASCAR Sprint Cup Series. Denny Hamlin won the race, his first points paying win at a restrictor plate track, and joined a list of drivers to win in their 300th start, while Greg Biffle finished second and Clint Bowyer, Brian Vickers, and A. J. Allmendinger rounded out the top five. The top rookies of the race were Kyle Larson (9th), Austin Dillon (15th), and Michael Annett (16th). This was the last race for the sponsor Aaron's

Previous week's race
Joey Logano came from fourth on the final restart to win his second NASCAR Sprint Cup Series race of the season in the Toyota Owners 400 at Richmond International Raceway. Logano triumphed in a furious battle over the last five laps with Matt Kenseth, Jeff Gordon and Brad Keselowski to score his fifth career win.

Casey Mears and Marcos Ambrose were both fined and placed on probation following their post-race altercation in the garage area in which Ambrose appeared to punch Mears in the face. NASCAR reviewed the fight and found that no punch was actually landed, so no penalty was issued for that part of the incident.

Report

Background

The track's turns are banked at 33 degrees, while the front stretch, the location of the finish line, is 18 degrees. The back stretch, opposite of the front, is at only two degrees. The racetrack has a seating capacity for 80,000 spectators. David Ragan was the defending race winner after winning the event in 2013.

Entry list
The entry list for the Aaron's 499 was released on Monday, April 28, 2014 at 1:11 p.m. Eastern time. Forty-seven drivers were entered for the race.

Practice

First practice
Marcos Ambrose had to go to a backup car after an unusual incident.

Final practice

Qualifying

Three rounds of Knockout Qualifying took place, the first instance that the new qualifying format was used in the Sprint Cup Series on a super speedway. Paul Menard, A. J. Allmendinger, Casey Mears and Austin Dillon rounded out the top five. The drivers had a wide range of opinions on the new format. "I don't know if anybody can really quite capture how intense that is. I'm telling you, it's just nerve-racking. You're trying to make all the right decisions as well as not wreck. It wasn't too crazy, but it was crazy enough to be fun," said Jeff Gordon. "It's hard because everybody wants to lag and nobody wants to go because the speed is at the back and not the front," said Brad Keselowski. Dale Earnhardt Jr. did not like the new format at Talladega. "It just wasn't much fun. I'd like to do some heat races or something maybe. That would be a little funner than this." Kasey Kahne and Truex Jr. started at the rear of the field after failing post-qualifying inspection. Kahne's car was too light and Truex's car failed to meet height requirements. "Basically we had a malfunction with a ballast container," Kahne's crew chief Kenny Francis said in a manufacturer release. "The cap that holds the ballast in came out. It could be mechanical or human error we are not really sure what happened. At the end of the day 25 pounds of ballast came out and we were 25 pounds light at the scales. The time was disallowed and we will have to start at the back." Dave Blaney, Eric McClure, Joe Nemechek and J. J. Yeley failed to qualify for the race.

Qualifying results

Race

Brian Scott led the field to the green flag at 1:20 p.m. Eastern time. He wouldn't lead a lap at all as his teammate Paul Menard took the lead with the stronger push coming from the inside line.

Leading the bottom line, Danica Patrick took the lead from Menard on lap six.

Jeff Gordon, who was pushing Patrick on the bottom, jumped to the middle line and assumed the lead on lap eight.

Danica took back the lead on lap nine.

Paul Menard found his way back to the front on lap 14.

Brad Keselowski jumped up to the middle in front of Gordon on lap 14, but as he tried to clear Danica, he got turned down into the paved runoff area going into turn 1. He saved it, but the car turned back up onto the track in turn 1 where he was about rammed in the rear by Trevor Bayne and Terry Labonte and cut down his right-front tire driving it through the grass. This would bring out the first caution of the race. “I’m not really sure what happened,’’ Keselowski said. “I made an aggressive move to take the lead and next thing I know I was spinning. Obviously, there was some kind of contact but I don’t know what happened.’’ “Danica made a mistake early,’’ Gordon said. “I don’t think that was an aggressive move. I think it was just a mistake that got (Keselowski) turned. She just misjudged him.’’ Landon Cassill stayed out to lead a lap before giving it back to Paul Menard.

The race restarted on lap 18.

Matt Kenseth took the lead on lap 20 riding the push from the high line.

Joey Logano used the inside line to take the lead on lap 21.

Denny Hamlin in the middle line took the lead on lap 32.

Carl Edwards used a push from the inside line to take the lead on lap 35.

Joey Logano, riding the bottom, took back the lead on lap 38.

Jimmie Johnson got a push from the middle line to take the lead on lap 41.

Logano took back the lead on lap 42.

Debris in turn 1 brought out the second caution of the race on lap 50. David Gilliland opted to stay out to lead a lap before handing over to Kyle Busch.

The race restarted on lap 55. Joey Logano jumped to the bottom line in front of Kyle to take back the lead.

Greg Biffle rode the bottom to take the lead on lap 57.

Jimmie Johnson used the middle line to retake the lead on lap 59.

Biffle was pushed back to the lead on lap 60.

Greg hit pit road on lap 95 to make his scheduled stop and handed the lead to teammate Carl Edwards.

Edwards made his stop on lap 96. Michael McDowell took the lead exiting pit road. He was not up to speed when Greg Biffle zipped right by him on the backstretch to take back the lead on lap 97.

The third caution flew on lap 106 after the cover to one of the backstretch caution lights was blown off. David Ragan stayed out to lead a lap before handing the lead to both Casey Mears and Dale Earnhardt Jr.

The race restarted on lap 111.

Trevor Bayne used a push from the top line to pull alongside Earnhardt Jr. before taking the lead on lap 113.

Dale Earnhardt Jr. eventually moved back to the head of the field on lap 119.

Despite being six laps down, Brad Keselowski pulled the middle line up to the front to help another driver challenge Dale for the lead. Unfortunately, coming through turn 4, Keselowski got loose and spun out in front of the field and collected eleven other cars, including points leader Jeff Gordon, defending race winner David Ragan and pole sitter Brian Scott, in the Big One on lap 137. “I was trying to get to the front and trying to stay up there and trying to  get my lap back,’’ Keselowski said. “For some reason, the car took off on me and spun out. I feel bad that we tore up a bunch of cars. Certainly I wanted to get my laps back and have a shot to win at the end. The only way I was going to do that was by being really aggressive at the front of the field.’’ “He was driving really, really, really aggressively to get back up there,’’ Kenseth said of Keselowski. “I didn’t realize he was that many laps down. I don’t know what his strategy was but just lost control of his car in front of the field and when that happens it always collects a bunch of them." Asked if he was bitter with the way Keselowski was racing, Kenseth said, “If it was the other way around and it was anybody else except for him, we’d all be getting lectured.’’ “I don’t know what he was doing,’’ Gordon said. “Obviously thinking that was going to be the way to get his lap back. All that it did was get a bunch of other cars wrecked.’’ Marcos Ambrose took over the lead by beating Dale off pit road.

The race restarted with 45 laps to go. Greg Biffle got a good push on the outside line and dropped down in front of Ambrose to take back the lead.

Dale Earnhardt Jr. dropped to the bottom line to take back the lead with 43 laps to go.

The fifth caution of the race flew with 38 laps to go after David Gilliland's engine blew up going down the backstretch (recently named Alabama Gang Superstretch). Greg Biffle opted not to pit to assume the lead.

The race restarted with 32 laps to go.

Brian Vickers jumped from the middle to the inside line to take the lead with 30 laps to go.

Denny Hamlin, leading the middle line, took the lead with 27 laps to go.

Vickers and Hamlin swapped the lead back and forth for the next five laps until Kevin Harvick jumped to the head of the table with 21 laps to go.

Jimmie Johnson got loose in turn 3, overcorrected, hit Joey Logano and started an eight car crash. David Ragan, who made it through the first big wreck with no damage, was boxed in by Logano and Kurt Busch. This brought out the sixth caution of the race.

The race restarted with eight laps to go.

Denny Hamlin took back the lead on the restart. Hamlin and Harvick swapped the lead back and forth until Hamlin took the lead with six laps to go and the seventh caution of the race flew on the same lap. Carl Edwards was riding the third line from the bottom when he got loose and spun in turn 1. He was signaling the drivers behind him he might have had a left-rear tire going flat. He was hit driver side by Ryan Newman who, despite hitting him at high speed, suffered virtually no damage from the collision.

The race restarted with two laps to go.

As the field was coming to the white flag, Alex Bowman got hit from behind by Ryan Newman and turned down into Jimmie Johnson. He then turned head on into the wall just in front of the start/finish line. Also, Justin Allgaier got turned by Cole Whitt and slid through a small section of the infield grass that destroyed the nose of his car. A big piece of it detached from the car and landed in the middle of the track just a few feet from the start/finish line. With the field halfway down the backstretch, the caution was thrown and Denny Hamlin scored the victory. “We really just want to win races regardless of the implications this means for the Chase,” Hamlin said. “It feels like food to be back in Victory Lane. I’m just proud of our day today. We’ve come a long way. We couldn’t finish 22nd at the superspeedway races for a long time. It feels good to come to this type of racetrack and know you can win.” "It's frustrating because the simple fact is that we both felt we had the opportunity to pounce," Clint Bowyer said of the finish he’d hoped for teaming up with Biffle to catch the leader. "But NASCAR did the right thing. You can't put people in danger."

Race results

Race statistics
 Lead changes: 48 among different drivers
 Cautions/Laps: 8 for 31
 Red flags: 0
 Time of race: 3 hours, 17 minutes and 16 seconds
 Average speed:

Media

Television

Radio

Standings after the race

Drivers' Championship standings

Manufacturers' Championship standings

Note: Only the first sixteen positions are included for the driver standings.

Notes

References

Aaron's 499
Aaron's 499
NASCAR races at Talladega Superspeedway
Aaron's 499